Henry Elisha Beard (1864 – 18 December 1910) was an Australian politician. Born in Victoria, he received a primary education before becoming a bricklayer and railway inspector, as well as a union official. In 1904 he was elected to the Victorian Legislative Assembly as the Labor member for Jika Jika, holding the seat until 1907. In 1910 he was elected to the Australian House of Representatives as the member for Batman, again representing the Labor Party.

Beard died at a private hospital in Fitzroy in December 1910 from complications of an operation. He had been in poor health for several months. His death prompted the 1911 Batman by-election.

References

 

Australian Labor Party members of the Parliament of Australia
Members of the Australian House of Representatives for Batman
Members of the Australian House of Representatives
Victoria (Australia) state politicians
Australian bricklayers
1864 births
1910 deaths
Members of the Victorian Legislative Assembly
20th-century Australian politicians